The Great Green Wall, officially known as the Three-North Shelter Forest Program, also known as the Three-North Shelterbelt Program, is a series of human-planted windbreaking forest strips (shelterbelts) in China, designed to hold back the expansion of the Gobi Desert, and provide timber to the local population.

The project's name indicates that it is to be carried out in all three of the northern regions: the North, the Northeast and the Northwest. This project has historical precedences dating back to before the Common Era. However, in premodern periods, government sponsored afforestation projects along the historical frontier regions were mostly for military fortification.

Effects of the Gobi Desert

China has seen  of grassland overtaken every year by the Gobi Desert. These storms also have serious agricultural effects for other nearby countries, such as Japan, North Korea, and South Korea. The Green Wall project was begun in 1978, with the proposed end result of raising northern China's forest cover from 5 to 15 percent, thereby reducing desertification.

Methodology and successes
The fourth phase of the project, started in 2003, has two parts: the use of aerial seeding to cover wide swathes of land where the soil is less arid, and the offering of cash incentives to farmers to plant trees and shrubs in areas that are more arid.  A $1.2 billion oversight system (including mapping and surveillance databases) is also to be implemented.  The "wall" will have a belt with sand-tolerant vegetation arranged in checkerboard patterns to stabilize the sand dunes.  A gravel platform will be next to the vegetation to hold down sand and encourage a soil crust to form.  The trees should also serve as a windbreak from dust storms.

Individual efforts 
As the Chinese State has made efforts to fight the dust storms that have taken over parts of the Grasslands with the rapid use of afforestation.  There are various examples of individuals taking it upon themselves to combat the harsh unforgiving environment that the sand brings.  Yin Yuzhen and Li Yungsheng are both predominant figures who have combated the environments that they resided in.  Their efforts have taken decades to achieve and have transformed ecosystems into vibrant and lush oases in what otherwise would be a barren wasteland.  

Yin Yuzhen took it upon herself to singlehandedly plant trees to rehabilitate the desolate environment in the Uxin Banner of China’s Semi-Arid Western landscape. Yin’s afforestation efforts have been recognized by individuals such as Chinese Communist Party general secretary Xi Jinping, who, during the 2020 National People's Congress, described the actions of those such as Yin as a remarkable achievement and an overall improvement of the ecology in China.

Results and successes 
As of 2009, China's planted forest covered more than 500,000 square kilometers (increasing tree cover from 12% to 18%) – the largest artificial forest in the world. In 2008, winter storms destroyed 10% of the new forest stock, causing the World Bank to advise China to focus more on quality rather than quantity in its stock species.

According to Foreign Affairs, Three-North Shelter Forest Program successfully transitioned the economic model in the Gobi desert region from harmful farming agriculture to ecological-friendly tourism, fruit business, and forestry. 

In 2018, United State National Oceanic and Atmospheric Administration found the increase in forest coverage observed by satellites is consistent with the Chinese government data. According to Shixiong Cao, an ecologist at Beijing Forestry University, the Chinese government recognized the water shortages problem in arid regions and changed the approach to plant vegetation with lower water requirements. Zhang Jianlong, head of the forestry department, told the media that the goal was to sustain the health of vegetation and choose suitable plant species and irrigation techniques.

According to BBC News report in 2020, tree plantation programs resulted in significant carbon dioxide absorption and helped mitigated climate change. And the benefit of tree planting was underestimated by previous research.

Three-North Shelter Forest Program also reversed the desertification of the Gobi desert, which grew 10,000 square kilometers per year in the 1980s, but was shrinking by more than 2,000 square kilometers per year in 2022.

Criticism
In April 2003, Westen scientists argued the Chinese plan was either an inadequate solution or simply propaganda. Hong Jiang, a geography professor at the University of Wisconsin, worried trees could soak up large amounts of groundwater, which would be extremely problematic for arid regions like northern China. Dee Williams, a US Department of Interior anthropologist, pointed to China'a past failure examples in anti-desertification and suggested that planting trees were temporary fix that could not change behavior.

In December 2003, American futurist Alex Steffen on his website Worldchanging strongly criticized the Green Wall project. He claimed China wasn't using collaborative effort and information platforms to support the local effort. China's increasing levels of pollution have also weakened the soil, causing it to be unusable in many areas.

Research of reforested areas of the loess plateau has found that the planted vegetation used decreased the moisture from deeper soil levels to some degree compared to farmland.

Furthermore, planting blocks of fast-growing trees reduces the biodiversity of forested areas, creating areas unsuitable for plants and animals normally found in forests. "China plants more trees than the rest of the world combined", says John McKinnon, the head of the EU-China Biodiversity Programme. "But the trouble is they tend to be monoculture plantations. They are not places where birds want to live." The lack of diversity also makes the trees more susceptible to disease, as in 2000, when one billion poplar trees in Ningxia were lost to a single disease, setting back 20 years of planting efforts. China's forest scientists argued that monoculture tree plantations are more effective at absorbing the greenhouse gas carbon dioxide than slow-growth forests, so while diversity may be lower, the trees purportedly help to offset China's carbon emissions. 
 
Liu Tuo, head of the desertification control office in the state forestry administration, believed that there are huge gaps in the country's efforts to reclaim the land that has become desert. In 2011, there was around 1.73 million km2 of land that had become desert in China, of which 530,000 km2 was treatable. But at the present rate of treating 1,717 km2 per year, it would take 300 years to reclaim the land that has become desert.

See also
Buffer strip
Energy-efficient landscaping
Great Green Wall (Africa)

Great Plains Shelterbelt, 1930s–40s, US
Great Plan for the Transformation of Nature, 1940s–50s, Soviet Union 
Macro-engineering
Sand fence
Seawater greenhouse
Deforestation and climate change
Mu Us Desert, a desert affected by the Great Green Wall
List of countries by carbon dioxide emissions

References

External links 
 China's Great Green Wall
 China's forest shelter project dubbed "green Great Wall"
 Grassland ecology to curb sandstorms
 Taming the Yellow Dragon - The Korea Herald

Desert greening
Desertification
Forestry in China
Forestry initiatives
Gobi Desert
Environmental issues in China
Macro-engineering
Reforestation
1978 in the environment
Climate change in China